The Marxist–Leninist Communist Party may refer to one of several organisations:

 Communist Party (Marxist–Leninist) of Panama
 Communist Party (Marxist–Leninist) (United States)
 Communist Party of Belgium – Marxist–Leninist
 Communist Party of Britain (Marxist–Leninist)
 Communist Party of Bolivia (Marxist–Leninist)
 Communist Party of Canada (Marxist–Leninist)
 Communist Party of Colombia (Marxist–Leninist)
 Communist Party of Denmark/Marxist–Leninists
 Communist Party of Germany/Marxists–Leninists
 Communist Party of Great Britain (Marxist–Leninist)
 Communist Party of Greece (Marxist–Leninist)
 Communist Party of Iceland (Marxist–Leninist)
 Communist Party of Ireland (Marxist–Leninist)
 Communist Party of India (Marxist–Leninist)
 Communist Party of India (Marxist–Leninist) Liberation
 Communist Party of India (Marxist–Leninist) People's War
 Communist Party of India (Marxist–Leninist) Red Star
 Communist Party of India (Marxist–Leninist) Second Central Committee
 Communist Party of Malaya/Marxist–Leninist
 Communist Party of Mexico (Marxist–Leninist)
 Communist Party of Nepal (Unified Marxist–Leninist)
 Communist Party of Peru (Marxist–Leninist)
 Communist Party of Spain (Marxist–Leninist)
 Communist Party of Turkey/Marxist–Leninist
 Communist Party USA (Marxist–Leninist)
 Marxist–Leninist Communist Party of Benin
 Marxist–Leninist Communist Party of Belgium
 Marxist–Leninist Communist Party of Ecuador
 Marxist–Leninist Communist Party of Greece
 Marxist–Leninist Communist Party (Turkey)
 Marxist–Leninist Communist Party of Venezuela
 Marxist–Leninist Italian Communist Party
 Marxist–Leninist Party of Germany
 New Haitian Communist Party (Marxist–Leninist)
 Japan Communist Party (Marxist–Leninist)
 Revolutionary Communist Party of Britain (Marxist–Leninist)

See also
 Communist party (disambiguation)
 List of communist parties
 Communist Party of Nepal (disambiguation)